Alexey Kedryuk (born 8 August 1980) is a professional Kazakhstani tennis player.

Kedryuk reached his highest individual ranking on the ATP Tour on August 28, 2006, when he became World number 261.

Kedryuk has been a member of the Kazakhstani Davis Cup team since 1995, posting a 43–17 record in singles and a 23–17 record in doubles in 51 ties.

ATP Challenger and ITF Futures finals

Singles: 20 (12–8)

Doubles: 69 (39–30)

References
 
 
 

1980 births
Living people
Kazakhstani male tennis players
Sportspeople from Almaty
21st-century Kazakhstani people